We'll Build Them a Golden Bridge is the debut album by Destroyer. Originally released on Tinker Recordings in 1996, it was reissued by Scratch Records on October 24, 2006.

The album's title is an allusion to Leo Tolstoy's novel War and Peace, in which Mikhail Kutuzov, the commander of the Russian army, promises to build Napoleon and the French army a "golden bridge" out of Russia - that is, to allow the French to continue on their hasty retreat without attempting to do battle, which would only bring about needless destruction and loss of life.

Track listing

Personnel 
Dan Bejar - vocals, acoustic guitar

References

1996 debut albums
Destroyer (band) albums